South London Liberal Synagogue is a synagogue at Prentis Road in Streatham in the London Borough of Lambeth. The community is currently served by Rabbi Nathan Godleman.

The synagogue, which is affiliated to Liberal Judaism, was established in 1929 as one of the first Liberal Jewish congregations in the UK. Its first president was Lily Montagu, one of Liberal Judaism's founders.  The congregation moved to its present home in Prentis Road (formerly a girls’ school) in 1938. It appointed its first full-time minister, Rabbi John Rayner, in 1953. The synagogue's ministers since then include Rabbi Julia Neuberger, minister from 1977 to 1989.

References

External links
 Official website

Synagogues in London
Liberal synagogues in the United Kingdom
Religion in the London Borough of Lambeth
Streatham
1929 establishments in England